FK Sloga may refer to:
FK Sloga Bar, Montenegrin football club 
FK Sloga Bajina Bašta, Serbian football club
NK Sloga Bosanska Otoka, Bosnia and Herzegovina football club
FK Sloga Despotovac, Serbian football club
FK Sloga Doboj, Bosnia and Herzegovina football club
FK Sloga Jugomagnat, Macedonian football club, playing in Skopje
FK Sloga Kraljevo, Serbian football club 
FK Sloga 1976 Lažani, Macedonian football club
FK Sloga Leskovac, Serbian football club 
NK Sloga Nova Gradiška, Croatian football club
FK Sloga Petrovac na Mlavi, Serbian football club
FK Sloga Požega, Serbian football club
FK Sloga Radnički Erdevik, Serbian football club
FK Sloga Simin Han, Bosnia and Herzegovina football club
FK Sloga Sjenica, Serbian football club 
FK Sloga Temerin, Serbian football club
FK Sloga 1934 Vinica, Macedonian football club